Covered in Soul is the eighth studio album by American recording artist Angie Stone, released on August 5, 2016, by Goldenlane Records. A cover album, it marked her first release with the label following short stints with Stax, Saguaro Road and Shanachie Records. Preceded by the single "These Eyes", a cover of the same-titled The Guess Who song, it failed to chart.

Track listing

References

External links
 

2016 albums
Angie Stone albums